Bakhresa Group is an industrial conglomerate based in Tanzania, East Africa. Owned by an entrepreneur and Tanzanian billionaire Said Salim Bakhresa, the business is one of the largest in the region.

The Group has its operations spread in Tanzania Mainland & Zanzibar, Kenya, Uganda, Malawi, Mozambique, Zambia, Rwanda, Burundi, Zimbabwe and in South Africa. 

There are range of companies under its umbrella and with investments primarily in the Food and Beverage Sector, Packaging, Logistics, Marine Passenger Services, Petroleum and Entertainment.
The products and services provided by the group are:

    Wheat Flour, Wheat Bran
    Maize Flour, Maize Bran
   Biscuits & Bakery Products
    Carbonated Soft Drinks & Malt Flavoured Products
    Natural Fruit Juices
    Ice Cream
    Bottled Water
    Polypropylene Bags including laminated bags for cement industries
    Plastic Packaging Materials including printing
    Paper Bags
    Petroleum Products
    Marine Passenger Ferry & Air passenger facilities Services
    Inland Container Depot
    Road Transport Services
    Azam Media
    Azam F.C.

References

External links
 Official website
Bakhresa Group on dnb.com

Conglomerate companies of Tanzania